Ricky Lynn Waddell (born 31 October 1959) is a retired lieutenant general in the United States Army Reserve who last served as the Assistant to the Chairman of the Joint Chiefs of Staff from 2018 to 2021. He served as a Deputy National Security Advisor to President Donald Trump from 2017 to 2018. His promotion to lieutenant general was authorized by the United States Senate on 26 September 2019.

He retired on 1 October 2021.

Early life

Waddell attended the United States Military Academy, graduating in 1982 with a degree of Bachelor of Science.

Military career

Waddell became an Engineer Officer with 15th Engineer Battalion, then the 9th Infantry Division as a Platoon Leader and Battalion Maintenance Officer. With Joint Task Force Bravo at Soto Cano (Palmerola) Air Base, Comayagua, Honduras, he served as the JTF Engineer. In the 35th Engineer Battalion, he served as the Commander C Company. He returned to the United States Military Academy as an instructor in the Department of Social Sciences. He subsequently served as Director for European Security Affairs on the National Security Council.

Waddell has been an Active Reserve officer, filling the following roles:
 Special Assistant at the Office of the Deputy Under Secretary of the Army; 
 Deputy Commander for Mobilization and Reserve Affairs, United States Southern Command, Florida
 Energy Sector Strategic Analyst, United States Central Command
 Special Advisor, 101st Airborne Division (Air Assault), Tikrit, Iraq
 Joint Strategic Planner, Headquarters Multi-National Force – Iraq;
 Director of Oil, J9, United States Forces – Iraq
 J4 (operational support – wartime), United States Forces Korea
 Director, Combined Joint Interagency Task Force – Shafafiyat ("transparency"), NATO International Security Assistance Force, Kabul, Afghanistan (following H. R. McMaster)
 Commander, 76th Operational Response Command, Salt Lake City, Utah (Major General; assumed command, 17 October 2015)

A special retirement review was held for Waddell at Conmy Hall, Joint Base Myer-Henderson Hall on 13 August 2021. He is set to vacate his role as assistant to the Chairman of the Joint Chiefs of Staff at the end of September 2021, with his retirement effective on 1 October 2021.

Civilian career
Waddell spent 17 years working in South America. His roles included Managing Director for South America, BG Group (oil and gas) and Chief Executive Officer, Anglo Ferrous Metals in Brazil. During this period, he lived for 12 years in Sao Paulo, Brazil.

Waddell ran the Keystone, Capstone, and Pinnacle programs as a civilian employee of the Department of Defense at the National Defense University, Washington, D.C.

Deputy National Security Advisor

In early May 2017, Waddell was reportedly named as the White House's Deputy National Security Advisor, following K. T. McFarland, to serve under Lieutenant General H. R. McMaster, National Security Advisor. Waddell's appointment was blocked, initially, by White House Chief of Staff, Reince Priebus. The announcement was made official on 19 May 2017.

On 12 April 2018, the White House announced that Waddell would leave in the coming weeks. His departure happened shortly after John R. Bolton's appointment as National Security Advisor. Waddell was one of several officials who left at Bolton's request.

Decorations and awards

Education
Waddell has received the following degrees:

Bachelor of Science in Engineering – United States Military Academy
Master of Public Administration – Webster University
Bachelor of Arts in History and Portuguese – Corpus Christi College, Oxford as a Rhodes Scholar
Doctor of Philosophy in International Relations – Columbia University

Publications
Waddell has written four historical military books, dealing with his Latin America and Army experiences:
 Wars Then & Now
 In War's Shadow: Waging Peace in Central America
 The Army and Low Intensity Conflict
 In War's Shadow – At the Edge of the Cold War
 
Waddell has also published various journal articles, including:
 R. D. Hooker Jr. and Ricky L. Waddell, The Future of Conventional Deterrence, Naval War College Review, Summer 1992.

References

External links 

 Official biography – Joint Chiefs of Staff
 Official biography – US Army Reserve

1959 births
Living people
People from Bentonville, Arkansas
Military personnel from Arkansas
Writers from Arkansas
United States Military Academy alumni
American Rhodes Scholars
Alumni of Corpus Christi College, Oxford
Webster University alumni
School of International and Public Affairs, Columbia University alumni
American male writers
United States Army generals
Trump administration personnel
United States Deputy National Security Advisors